Lidke Ice Stream is an ice stream about  long flowing north into Stange Sound, east of Mount Benkert, on the English Coast of Palmer Land, Antarctica. It was mapped by the United States Geological Survey (USGS) from surveys and U.S. Navy aerial photographs, 1961–66, and was first visited by a USGS field party in January 1985. The ice stream was named by the Advisory Committee on Antarctic Names after USGS geologist David J. Lidke, a member of the field party.

References

Ice streams of Antarctica
Bodies of ice of Palmer Land